Doug is a male personal name (or, depending on which definition of "personal name" one uses, part of a personal name). It is sometimes a given name (or "first name"), but more often it is hypocorism (affectionate variation of a personal name) which takes the place of a given name, usually Douglas. Notable people with the name include: Douglas Grosch, ex.

People

A
 Doug Allison (1846–1916), American baseball player
 Doug Anderson (disambiguation), multiple people
 Doug Applegate (disambiguation), multiple people 
 Doug Armstrong (born 1964), Canadian National Hockey League team general manager
 Doug Armstrong (broadcaster) (1931–2015), New Zealand cricketer, television sports broadcaster and politician

B
 Doug Baldwin (born 1988), American football player
 Doug Baldwin (ice hockey) (1922–2007), Canadian ice hockey player 
 Doug Bennett (disambiguation), multiple people
 Doug Bereuter (born 1939), American former politician
 Doug Bing (born 1950/51), Canadian politician
 Doug Bowser (born 1965), current President of Nintendo of America
 Doug Bradley (born 1954), English actor
 Doug Brown (disambiguation), multiple people
 Doug Burgum (born 1956), Governor of North Dakota (2016–present)

C
 Doug Cameron (disambiguation), multiple people
 Doug Carpenter (born 1942), former National Hockey League head coach
 Doug Chapman (disambiguation), multiple people
 Doug Christie (basketball) (born 1970), American basketball player
 Doug Christie (lawyer) (1946–2013), Canadian lawyer and activist
 Doug Clark (disambiguation), multiple people
 Doug Collins (disambiguation), multiple people
 Doug Cooper (racing driver) (1938–1987), American NASCAR driver
 Doug Costin (born 1997), American football player
 Doug Cowie (footballer) (1926–2021), Scottish footballer
 Doug Cowie (umpire) (born 1946), New Zealand cricket umpire
 Doug Cox (disambiguation), multiple people
 Doug Cunningham (politician) (born 1954), former Nebraska State Senator
 Doug Cunningham (American football) (1945–2015), American former National Football League running back

D
 Doug Davies (disambiguation), multiple people
 Doug Davis (disambiguation), multiple people
 Doug DeMuro (born 1988), American automotive journalist

E
 Doug Edert (born 2000), American basketball player
 Doug Eisenman (born 1968), American tennis player
 Doug Elliot (politician) (1917–1989), Australian politician
 Doug Elliott (author), American storyteller, naturalist and author
 Doug Elliott (musician) (born 1962), Canadian musician
 Doug Emhoff (born 1964), husband of Kamala Harris; first and current Second Gentleman of the United States
 Douglas Engelbart (1925–2013), American engineer, inventor and early computer and Internet pioneer
 Doug Evans (disambiguation), multiple people

F
 Doug Ferguson (disambiguation), multiple people
 Doug Fieger (1952–2010), American singer-songwriter and musician, member of the rock band The Knack
 Doug Fisher (actor) (1941–2000), British actor
 Doug Fisher (politician) (1919–2009), Canadian politician and columnist
 Doug Flutie (born 1962), American football player
 Doug Ford (disambiguation), multiple people
 Doug Fraser (Australian footballer) (1886–1919), Australian rules footballer
 Doug Fraser (Scottish footballer) (born 1941), Scottish football player and manager
 Doug Frost (swimming coach) (born 1943), Australian swimming coach
 Doug Frost (wine), American Master of Wine, Master Sommelier and author

G
 John Douglas Gibson (1925/26–1984), usually known as Doug Gibson, Australian ornithologist
 Doug Graham (disambiguation), multiple people
 Doug Grassel (1949–2013), American guitarist, member of the bubblegum pop band the Ohio Express
 Doug Green (disambiguation), multiple people
 Doug Gurr (born 1964), British businessman

H
 Doug Harris (disambiguation), multiple people
 Doug Harvey (ice hockey) (1924–1989), Canadian National Hockey League player, member of the Hockey Hall of Fame
 Doug Harvey (umpire) (1930–2018), member of the Baseball Hall of Fame
 Doug Henry (baseball) (born 1963), American former Major League Baseball relief pitcher
 Doug Henry (motocross) (born 1969), American former motocross racer, three-time AMA national champion
 Doug Hoyle, Baron Hoyle (born 1930), British politician
 Doug Hutchison (born 1960), American character actor
 Doug Johnson (disambiguation), multiple people
 Doug Jones (disambiguation), multiple people

K
 Doug Kelly (footballer), English footballer in the 1950s
 Doug Kershaw (born 1936), American country music fiddle player, singer and songwriter
 Doug Kramer (American football) (born 1998), American football player

L
 Doug Lee (basketball) (born 1964), American retired National Basketball Association player
 Doug Lewis (disambiguation), multiple people
 Doug Lowe (Australian politician) (born 1942), 35th premier of Tasmania

M
 Doug MacLeod (musician) (born 1946), American blues musician, guitarist, and songwriter
 Doug MacLeod (TV writer) (1959–2021), Australian screenwriter and author
 Doug Martin (disambiguation), multiple people
 Doug McAdam (born 1951), sociology professor at Stanford University
 Doug McEnulty (1922–1991), American National Football League player
 Doug McIntosh (1945–2021), American basketball player
 Doug McLean, Sr. (1880–1947), Australian rugby union and rugby league player
 Doug Mitchell (Canadian football) (born 1942), retired Canadian Football League offensive lineman
 Doug Mitchell (film producer) (born 1952)
 Doug McLean, Jr. (1912–1961), Australian rugby union and rugby league player, son of Doug McLean, Sr.
 Doug Morgan (disambiguation), multiple people
 Doug Mowat (1929–1992), Canadian politician

P
 Doug Parkinson (1946–2021), Australian singer
 Doug Parkinson (politician) (born 1945), Australian former politician
 Doug Peterson (yacht designer) (1945–2017), American yacht designer
 Doug Peterson (Nebraska politician) (born 1959), American lawyer and politician
 Doug Plank (born 1953), American football player
 Doug Powell (disambiguation), multiple people

R
 Doug Roberts (ice hockey) (born 1942), American former National Hockey League and World Hockey Association player
 Doug Robinson (ice hockey) (born 1940), Canadian former National Hockey League player
 Doug Rogers (disambiguation), multiple people

S
 Doug Smith (disambiguation), multiple people
 Doug Smylie (1922–1983), Canadian Football League player
 Doug Spradley (born 1966), American-German basketball coach and former player
 Doug Stanhope (born 1967), American comedian
 Doug Supernaw (1960–2020), American country music singer-songwriter and musician
 Doug Sutherland (disambiguation), multiple people

T
 Doug Taitt (1902–1970), American Major League Baseball player and minor league player/manager

W
 Doug Walker (born 1981), American actor and internet personality
 Doug White (politician), American member of the Ohio House of Representatives (1991–1996) and Senate (1996–2004)
 Doug White (news anchor) (1944–2006), American news anchor
 Doug Williams (disambiguation), multiple people
 Doug Wilson (disambiguation), multiple people
 Doug Wright (disambiguation), multiple people

Fictional characters
 Doug Whitty, a baby in the American animated sitcom television series Family Guy
 Doug, a baby in the comic strip Dog Eat Doug
 Doug, a character in the 2012 video game The Walking Dead
 Doug Borski, one of the main characters on the Canadian teen-adult animated series Sons of Butcher
 Doug Carter, on the British soap opera Hollyoaks
 Doug Dimmadome, owner of the Dimmsdale Dimmadome, from the TV show Fairly Odd Parents
 Doug, a koala man from the adult animated sitcom Ugly Americans
 Doug Funnie, the main character on the animated series Doug
 Doug Heffernan, the main character on the American sitcom The King of Queens
 Doug McKenzie, on the Canadian television show SCTV
 Douglas Potts, on the British soap opera Emmerdale
 Doug Williams (Days of Our Lives), on the American soap opera Days of Our Lives
 Doug Willis, on the Australian soap opera Neighbours
 Doug Witter, in the television series Dawson's Creek

Animals 
 Doug the Pug (born 2012), internet and social media personality

References

English masculine given names
Hypocorisms
Masculine given names